Kakajin (also Romanized as Kakajīn and Kakjīn; also known as Kakadzha, Kakājeyā, Kākājia, Kākāzhīn, and Kakchin) is a village in Eqbal-e Gharbi Rural District, in the Central District of Qazvin County, Qazvin Province, Iran. At the 2006 census, its population was 91, in 20 families.

References 

Populated places in Qazvin County